The spotted least gecko (Sphaerodactylus millepunctatus) is a species of lizard in the family Sphaerodactylidae. It is endemic to Central America.

References

idk

Sphaerodactylus
Reptiles described in 1861